The flexible path was a set of destinations for further crewed space exploration in the inner Solar System proposed in the Review of United States Human Space Flight Plans Committee of 2009 and was envisioned as alternative to the Moon-first and Mars-first approaches.

In 2010 president Barack Obama announced change in the space policy from the Moon-first approach (adopted previously under the Vision for Space Exploration and Constellation program) to a variety of destinations resembling the flexible path approach.

Outer space exploration destinations envisioned in US space policy 
Bold designates missions beyond Cis-lunar space.
Legend:   [flyby] — [orbit] — [landing]

Current as of 2010:
 sub-orbital flights
 Low Earth Orbit - the International Space Station (Constellation program initial destination)
Flexible path beyond Low Earth Orbit:
 Moon flyby or orbit - for testing and development purposes
 Earth-Moon L1 - assembly complex for other missions, servicing of propellant depots or other spacecraft such as self-propulsion observatories and reusable non-reentry crew or cargo vehicles
 Earth-Sun L2 - servicing of space observatories requiring Earth shade
 Earth-Sun L1 - servicing of solar observatories or crewed solar observatory (similar to proposal for the Apollo Applications Program)
 Near-Earth objects (Constellation program third destination)
 Mars flyby
 Moon landing (Constellation program second destination)
 Mars orbit, including robotic landing and sample return
 Mars Moons
 Venus flyby or orbit (similar to proposal for the Apollo Applications Program)
 Mars landing (Constellation program final destination)

The list is ordered according to the delta-v required by the mission.

References 

Spaceflight concepts
2010 in American politics
2010 in spaceflight
Human spaceflight
Constellation program
Discovery and exploration of the Solar System
Space policy of the United States